David Charlesworth, OSB (born 6 October 1951) is the Abbot of Buckfast Abbey in Devon, England. He is a member of the Order of Saint Benedict.

Biography
In September 1970, Charlesworth joined Buckfast Abbey and the Order of Saint Benedict as a novice. From 1974 to 1977, he studied at Newman College of Higher Education, a Catholic teacher training college. From 1977, he taught maths and science at Buckfast Abbey Preparatory School. He was ordained to the priesthood in 1984 and became abbot of Buckfast in 1992.

Charlesworth commissioned Torbay-based theater-company Unleashed Productions to adapt the stories in Philip Yancey's book What's So Amazing About Grace? into a play, which they did and then performed at the abbey in 2010.

Charlesworth commissioned a 79-year-old nun, Mother Joanna, to paint an 18 x 26 ft acrylic mural on twenty wooden panels for the abbey's restaurant, the Grange. When the mural was unveiled in April 2014, Charlesworth called it "a monumental effort by Mother Joanna depicting the extraordinary work of a handful of monks who built the present church on the 12th century foundations in only 32 years".

In 2013, Alex Neil, Cabinet Secretary for Health, Wellbeing and Sport, contacted Buckfast Abbey and said that they should stop making Buckfast Tonic Wine. Charlesworth later said to the media, "If you ban Buckfast, ban Scottish whisky. It's alcohol, much stronger. But oh no they wouldn't do that. So they are picking on a particular thing as a conscience salver." In response, Member of the Scottish Parliament Elaine Smith said that Buckfast Tonic Wine is more problematic than Scotch whisky because of Buckfast's caffeine content. Charlesworth said that blaming Buckfast Tonic Wine for alcohol-related crime, violence, and anti-social behaviour within the "Buckfast Triangle" of Scotland is "not fair", as  the tonic wine is legal and "not made to be abused".

Charlesworth is one of the founders of the School of the Annunciation. In 2014, Charlesworth invited Robert Atwell, the new Bishop of Exeter, to spend some time in reflection with Buckfast Abbey's monks, and Atwell accepted. On 9 April 2021 Charlesworth was re-elected Abbot of Buckfast.

References

1951 births
Living people
English abbots
English Benedictines
Clergy from Devon
People associated with Newman University, Birmingham